DISY may refer to:

The Democratic Alliance (Greek: Δημοκρατική Συμμαχία — ΔΗ.ΣΥ.), a political party in Greece
The Democratic Rally (Greek: Δημοκρατικός Συναγερμός — ΔΗ.ΣΥ.), a political party in Cyprus